The Funiculaire de Saint-Hilaire du Touvet, or Saint-Hilaire du Touvet Funicular, is a funicular railway in the département of Isère in the Rhône-Alpes region of France.

Until the funicular was built, the village of St. Hilaire du Touvet was accessible only on foot, or by mule. The construction of the funicular was started in 1920 and it was opened in 1924, principally to serve several sanatoria built to house tuberculosis patients. A road has long since been opened, and the funicular is now used mostly by tourists and paragliders.

Until 1955, the funicular was served by two 40 passenger cars. These were replaced in that year by a more modern design of car, carrying 60 passengers each. In 1992, these were in turn replaced by new cars to a retro design, not dissimilar to the original cars.

See also 
 List of funicular railways

References

External links

Funiculaire de St. Hilaire du Touvet web site 
Funimag article on the Funiculaire de St. Hilaire du Touvet 

Saint-Hilaire du Touvet, Funiculaire de
Tourist attractions in Isère
Metre gauge railways in France
Transport in Auvergne-Rhône-Alpes
Railway lines opened in 1924